Christine Marie Magnuson (born October 17, 1985) is an American competition swimmer and two-time Olympic medalist.  She has won a total of five medals in major international competition, four silvers, and one bronze spanning the Olympics, the World Championships, and the Pan Pacific Championships.

Early years
Magnuson was born in John, Illinois, and graduated from Victor J. Andrew HIgh School in Tinley Park, Illinois.  She received an athletic scholarship to attend the University of Tennessee, where she swam for the Tennessee Volunteers swimming and diving team in National Collegiate Athletic Association (NCAA) and Southeastern Conference (SEC) competition from 2005 to 2008.  At the 2008 NCAA Championships, Magnuson won an individual national championship in the 100-yard butterfly.  She finished her college career with 23 All-American honors, three school records and five SEC individual championships.

International swimming career

2008 Summer Olympics

Magnuson won the silver medal in the 100-meter butterfly final, finishing behind Libby Trickett of Australia who had won the gold medal in an Oceanic record.  She also set an American record in that event during the semifinals.  Magnuson earned her second medal, also a silver, in the 4×100-meter medley relay finishing behind team Australia.

2009 World Championships

Magnuson advanced to the 100-meter butterfly semifinals and finished tenth overall.  Magnuson also swam the third leg in the 4×100-meter freestyle relay but the United States finished fourth in the final.

See also
 List of Olympic medalists in swimming (women)
 List of University of Tennessee people
 List of World Aquatics Championships medalists in swimming (women)

References

External links
 
 
 
 
 
 

1985 births
Living people
American female butterfly swimmers
Olympic silver medalists for the United States in swimming
Swimmers at the 2008 Summer Olympics
Medalists at the 2008 Summer Olympics
World Aquatics Championships medalists in swimming
Tennessee Volunteers women's swimmers
University of Tennessee alumni
People from Tinley Park, Illinois